Paolo Marucelli or Marucelli (15941649) was an Italian architect, most notable for the facade of the Palazzo Madama in Rome, begun to his designs in 1642 by L. Cardi. He also designed the sacristies of Santa Maria in Vallicella (1629) and Santa Maria dell'Anima (1635) and the convents of San Ignazio and Sant' Andrea della Valle.

External links

Architects from Rome
17th-century Italian architects
1594 births
1649 deaths